The 1970 Northeastern Huskies football team was an American football team that represented  Northeastern University as an independent during the 1970 NCAA College Division football season. In their 23rd year under head coach Joe Zabilski, the team compiled a 3–5 record.

Schedule

References

Northeastern
Northeastern Huskies football seasons
Northeastern Huskies Football